Shabana Akhtar Bakhsh (born 1981) is a Scottish actress of Pakistani descent who has appeared in soap operas such as River City and Doctors. Her best known role is in the BBC One school-based drama series Waterloo Road starring as English teacher Jasmine Koreshi.

Biography
Shabana Akhtar Bakhsh made her acting debut in River City as Zara Malik, who moved to Aberdeen. Her parents are of Pakistani origin. She went on to appear in Ken Loach's Ae Fond Kiss. She then became a regular in Doctors as Tasha Verma. She appeared in the BBC One school-based drama series, Waterloo Road, as newly qualified English teacher Jasmine Koreshi. She currently lives in Glasgow. In 2009 travelled around Scottish schools with TAG theatre company in the production "Yellow Moon", a play by David Greig, where she plays the character Silent Leila.

She has been an outspoken critic of the BBC, saying that they are afraid to write for ethnic minorities. She has also campaigned for women's rights in the Asian community.

Filmography

Film

Television

References

External links

 Article about Shabana on the Daily Record website
Small extract on Ae Fond Kiss article
Waterloo Road article about her and her character
Article on Scotsman's website about Shabana

1981 births
Living people
Scottish television actresses
Scottish soap opera actresses
Scottish film actresses
Scottish people of Pakistani descent
People educated at Bellahouston Academy
British film actors of Pakistani descent